Kentlandoceras is a genus of middle Ordovician Oncocerids (family Oncoceratidae). Its shell is curved exogastrically, such that the ventral margin is longitudinally convex, but less so than in Loganoceras, and with a submarginal ventral siphuncle instead. The siphuncle in Loganoceras is subcentral. The related Romingoceras is more curved, also with a ventral siphuncle. 
  
All three genera are from the Middle Ordovician of North America.

References

 Walter C Sweet, 1964. Nautiloidea -Oncocerida; Treatise on Invertebrate Paleontology, Part K. Geological Society of America and University of Kansas Press.
 Kentlandoceras, Paleobiology database.

Prehistoric nautiloid genera